Events from the year 1740 in Russia

Incumbents
 Empress – Anna  until 
 Emperor – Ivan VI after 
 Regent – Ernst Johann von Biron ( – ), Sovereign and Grand Duchess Anna Leopoldovna (since 20 November)

Events

 January - The Ice House was built in St. Petersburg.
 28 October - 2-months old Prince Ivan Antonovich succeeds Empress Anna of Russia as Ivan VI under the regency of Anna's favourite Ernst von Biron.
 20 November - Biron was arrested by the guards led by Burkhard Christoph von Münnich
 The rulers of the northeast of the Middle Zhuz, including Ablai Khan, concluded an agreement on the Russian protectorate over the Middle Zhuz.

Births

 29 February - Thomas MacKenzie, admiral, founder of Sevastopol.
 7 May - Nikolai Arkharov, Governor General of Moscow (1781–1784)
 28 May - Fedot Shubin, architect
  - Ivan VI, Emperor of Russia in 1740–41. (d. 1764)
 - Ivan Lepyokhin, Russian naturalist, zoologist, botanist and explorer. (d. 1802)

Deaths

 8 July - Artemy Volynsky, Pyotr Yeropkin and Andrey Khrushchyov, statesmen (executed)
 
 
 28 October - Anna, empress of Russia (born 1693)

References

1740 in Russia
Years of the 18th century in the Russian Empire